Geir Børresen (16 November 1942 – 25 July 2022) was a Norwegian actor and entertainer.

Biography 
Børresen was born in Oslo on 16 November 1942. He made his film debut in Liv in 1967, and made his stage debut at Nationaltheatret in 1968. He was a presenter on Lekestue, based on BBC's Play School, for NRK from 1975–1981.

He played the characters "Labbetuss" and "Max Mekker" in the television series Sesam Stasjon (a Norwegian spin-off of Sesame Street) in the 1990s. He provided the voice of Trigger in the Norwegian dub of Robin Hood (1973 film).

He is known for songs based on the comics series The Smurfs, and his albums I Smurfeland (1978),  Sommer i Smurfeland (1979) and Alle gode ting er Smurf (1979) sold a total of nearly 400,000 copies.

Børresen died in Bærum on 25 July 2022.

References

1942 births
2022 deaths
Male actors from Oslo
Norwegian male stage actors
Norwegian male film actors
Norwegian male television actors
NRK people
Children's musicians
Musicians from Oslo